The Schwerer Wehrmachtschlepper (sWS; "Heavy Military Tractor") was a German World War II half-track vehicle used in various roles between 1943 and 1945. The unarmored models were used as supply vehicles and as tractors to haul artillery. Armored versions mounted anti-aircraft guns or a 10 barrel rocket launcher (Nebelwerfer). Fewer than a thousand were built before the end of the war, but production continued after the war of an improved model in the Tatra plant in Czechoslovakia.

History
On 7 May 1942 Hitler ordered development of a simple, low-speed, half-track, load-carrying vehicle for use on the Eastern Front. Büssing-NAG was selected to develop a new  tractor (Zgkw. 5t neuer Art) to replace the earlier 5 tonne Sd.Kfz. 6 and  Sd.Kfz. 11 half-tracks, as well as the various lesser-known vehicles of the same class. Production started in December 1943 at Büssing-NAG. Early examples used a truck-like, unarmored cabin similar to the earlier half-tracks it replaced, while later examples featured an armored cabin and engine compartment that looked similar to the Sd.Kfz. 251 armored personnel carrier. Like the earlier Demag-designed Sd.Kfz. 10, the sWS's suspension system consisted of five double roadwheels per side, overlapping and interleaved in the  layout, mounted on swing arms sprung by torsion bars. One idler wheel, mounted at the rear end of each track unit, was used to control track tension.

Tatra also joined in production, but together both factories produced only 825 vehicles in total. Tatra continued production of an improved vehicle after the war as the T809.

In addition to the basic cargo role, the vehicle was adapted as a mount both for the medium 3.7 cm FlaK 43 anti-aircraft gun and the quadruple 20mm flak gun. These mounts were placed at the center of the cargo area with a large gun shield. The sides of the cargo compartment folded down to give the crew more room to serve the weapons. Ammunition was carried at the rear of the cargo area. Another modification was the Panzerwerfer 42 auf sWS, a 10-barreled  Nebelwerfer 42 rocket launcher placed over an armored ammunition storage compartment; it was built over the cargo area that was intended to replace the 15 cm Panzerwerfer auf Sf (Sd.Kfz. 4/1), based on the Sd.Kfz. 4  half-track Maultier.

Armor

Variants 

 schweren Wehrmachtsschlepper mit Pritschenaufbau  flatbed body, about 770 built
 3,7 cm Flak 43/1 auf Selbstfahrlafette schwerer Wehrmachtsschlepper mit Behelfspanzerung  - sometimes 2cm Flak fitted instead
 15 cm Panzerwerfer 42 auf Selbstfahrlafette schwerer Wehrmachtsschlepper mit Behelfspanzerung  - at least two built by Martini-Hütte in Salzkotten

Notes

References
 Chamberlain, Peter, and Hilary L. Doyle. Thomas L. Jentz (Technical Editor). Encyclopedia of German Tanks of World War Two: A Complete Illustrated Directory of German Battle Tanks, Armoured Cars, Self-propelled Guns, and Semi-tracked Vehicles, 1933–1945, London: Arms and Armour Press, 1978 (revised edition 1993). 
 Spielberger, Walter J. Halftracked Vehicles of the German Army 1909-1945, Atlgen, PA: Schiffer, 2008

External links
 sWS on wwiivehicles.com
 all known sWS info

World War II armoured fighting vehicles of Germany
World War II half-tracks
Artillery tractors
Half-tracks of Germany
Military vehicles introduced from 1940 to 1944